Peter Steven Ogilvie (born May 2, 1972) is a retired Canadian sprinter who competed primarily in the 200 metres. Growing up in Burnaby, British Columbia, Peter represented Canada at the 1992 and 1996 Summer Olympics, as well as, two outdoor (1991 & 1995), one indoor IAAF World Championships (1993), one Pan American Games (1991) and two Commonwealth Games (1990 & 1994). He won a silver medal in the 4 × 100 m relay at the 1991 Pan American Games, a gold medal in the 4 × 100 m relay at the 1994 Francophone Games in Paris, and bronze medal in the 1600m Medley Relay at the 1993 IAAF World Indoor Championships.

Currently, he holds the Men's Canadian Junior 200m record in 20.62 seconds (0.1w) that he established on May 25, 1991 in Provo, UT.

Competition record

Post-athletics career 
Ogilvie served as executive director of Athletics Alberta from 2005 to 2014. He was CEO of the organizing committee that managed the 18th Panamerican Junior Athletics Championships, which came to western North America for the first time in 2015. In fact, Peter Ogilvie is the first Pan Am Games medallist/ alumni in athletics to have successfully led the event management and operations of the Panamerican Junior Athletics Championships.

He was instrumental in organizing the first-ever amalgamated Canadian Track and Field Championships in 2015, which combines junior, senior, and para-athletes into one major event. In 2016, he again produced Athletics Canada's Canadian Track and Field Championships and Selection Trials for the 2016 Summer Olympic and Paralympic Games which was honoured as the 2016 CSTA Canadian Sport Event of the Year Award (Group B: budget less than $1 million).

Ogilvie is recognized for his unique talent for connecting sport and business to ensure that the right people come together to guarantee the success of these events. In the process he has made Edmonton the destination city for athletic events and created the foundation for establishing TrackTown Canada on March 28, 2014.

Ogilvie created and produces the TrackTown Classic, now in its second year, after redeveloping the event after the Edmonton International Track Classic (2010 - 2014) which he established while at Athletics Alberta. This international athletics competition, held at the University of Alberta's Foote Field, has been ranked consistently as one of the Top 50 IAAF invitational meets in the world for the past four years.

Personal bests
Outdoor
100 metres – 10.29 (+1.3 m/s) (Montreal 1995)
200 metres – 20.46 (+1.7 m/s) (Ingolstadt 1992)
400 metres – 46.93 (Provo 1992)
Indoor
60 metres – 6.70 (Saskatoon 1991)
200 metres – 21.15 (Toronto 1993)

Records 
 Canadian Junior 200m - 20.62 (+0.1 m/s) (Provo 1991)
 British Columbia High School Track & Field Provincial 100m - 10.46 (+0.6) (Burnaby 1990)

Accomplishments 
 Sport BC High School Athlete of the Year (1989)
 Sport BC High School Athlete of the Year (1990)
 Burnaby Sports Hall of Fame Inductee (2004) - Athlete
 City of Edmonton Salute to Excellence Sport Hall of Fame Inductee (2016) - Builder
 2016 CSTA Canadian Sport Event of the Year Award (Group B: budget less than $1 million) - Canadian Track and Field Championships and Selection Trials for the 2016 Summer Olympic and Paralympic Games (Edmonton, AB)
 2016 Edmonton Event Awards (Best Live Outdoor Event) - Canadian Track and Field Championships and Selection Trials for the 2016 Summer Olympic and Paralympic Games

References

External links
 
 
 
 
 
 

1972 births
Living people
Sportspeople from Burnaby
Canadian male sprinters
Olympic track and field athletes of Canada
Athletes (track and field) at the 1992 Summer Olympics
Athletes (track and field) at the 1996 Summer Olympics
Commonwealth Games competitors for Canada
Athletes (track and field) at the 1990 Commonwealth Games
Athletes (track and field) at the 1994 Commonwealth Games
Pan American Games silver medalists for Canada
Athletes (track and field) at the 1991 Pan American Games
Pan American Games medalists in athletics (track and field)
World Athletics Championships athletes for Canada
Medalists at the 1991 Pan American Games